Floyd Douglas Little (July 4, 1942 – January 1, 2021) was an American professional football player who was a halfback for the Denver Broncos, initially in the American Football League (AFL) and later the National Football League (NFL). He was a twice All-American at Syracuse University, and in 1967 was the sixth selection of the 1967 NFL/AFL draft, the first common draft. He was the first first-round draft pick to sign with the AFL's Broncos, where he was known as "the Franchise". Little was elected to the College Football Hall of Fame in 1983 and the Pro Football Hall of Fame in 2010.

Early life
Little was born in New Haven, Connecticut, on July 4, 1942. He attended the Hillhouse High School in New Haven and the Bordentown Military Institute in Bordentown, New Jersey.

College career
Little was recruited by Gen. Douglas MacArthur to play football at the United States Military Academy and had told him that he'd ascend to the rank of general if he enrolled at West Point. He was also recruited by the University of Notre Dame. Little ultimately chose to attend Syracuse at the persuasion of first African-American Heisman winner Ernie Davis. Little is the only three-time All-American running back to have played for the Syracuse University Orangemen.

Little played for Syracuse for three seasons. In 1964 he made 157 carries for 874 yards and 9 touchdowns and 17 catches for 257 yards and 1 touchdown. In 1965 he made 193 carries for 1,065 yards and 14 touchdowns and 21 catches for 248 yards and 1 touchdown. In 1966 he made 162 carries for 811 yards and 12 touchdowns and 13 catches for 86 yards and 2 touchdowns. Little finished 5th in Heisman Trophy voting in both 1965 and 1966.

Professional career
In 1975, Little retired as the NFL's 7th all-time leading rusher with 6,323 yards rushing and 54 total touchdowns (rushing, receiving and returns). He also threw a touchdown pass to receiver Jerry Simmons in a 1972 upset over the Oakland Raiders. During his rookie year, Little led the NFL in punt returns with a 16.9-yard average. He led the NFL in combined yards in 1967 and 1968. Little was Denver Broncos' team captain in all of his 9 seasons with the team, including his rookie one.

Little was a charter member of the Broncos' Ring of Fame in 1984, which also included; Rich Jackson, Lionel Taylor, and Goose Gonsoulin. He was the first Bronco to win a rushing title, leading the AFC in rushing in 1970 with 901 yards and the following year he became the first Bronco to eclipse 1,000 yards, gaining 1,133 to lead the NFL. Little was the first player to lead his conference in rushing for a last-place team and the 13th player ever in professional football to rush for at least 1,000 yards in one season. He was an American Football League All-Star in 1968. In a week 12 win over Buffalo, he caught 4 passes out of the backfield for 165 yards, including a 66-yard touchdown, setting a franchise record of 41.25 yards per reception which still stands. He was named first-team "All-AFL" in 1969, and made the AFC-NFC Pro Bowl in 1970, 1971, and 1973. At 5′10″ and 195 pounds, Little was the smallest back to lead the league in rushing since World War II. He led the league in combined yards in 1967 and 1968 and was the only player to return punts for touchdowns in both seasons. During a 6-year period (1968–1973), Little rushed for more yards and more yards from scrimmage (rushing and receiving) than any running back in the NFL.

Little acquired his nickname "the Franchise" because his decision to sign with the AFL's Broncos was credited with generating sufficient fan interest to keep the team from relocating in the 1960s, and with helping to convince Denver voters to approve funding for the purchase and expansion of Mile High Stadium.

In 2005, he was named to the Professional Football Researchers Association Hall of Very Good in the association's third HOVG class.

In 2009 Little was a finalist for induction into the Pro Football Hall of Fame. He was voted in on February 6, 2010, his induction took place in Canton, Ohio, on August 7, 2010.  Little is one of four players in the Super Bowl era to make the Hall of Fame without ever playing a postseason game.

From July 2011 to June 2016, Little served as the Special Assistant to the Athletic Director at Syracuse University.

Awards and honors

Little's jersey number, 44, was retired by the Broncos in 1975 in his honor and by the Syracuse football program on November 12, 2005, to honor Little, Ernie Davis, and Jim Brown, and the eight other players who wore the number. Little was inducted into the College Football Hall of Fame in 1983. He was inducted into the Denver Broncos' Ring of Fame on October 1, 1984.

On August 7, 2010, Little was inducted into the Pro Football Hall of Fame alongside Jerry Rice, Emmitt Smith, Russ Grimm, Rickey Jackson, John Randle, and Dick LeBeau. On September 15, 2011, the New Haven Athletic Center, billed as the largest scholastic athletics facility in New England, was renamed the Floyd Little Athletic Center. On May 15, 2016, Little received his honorary doctorate from Syracuse University in Humane Letters. On May 17, 2019, Little was awarded the University of Denver's Distinguished Alumni Award and on May 18, 2019, Little was awarded an Honorary Doctorate of Laws as speaker at DU's Sturm College of Law's commencement ceremonies. Syracuse's football practice facility has a bronze statue of Little alongside Jim Brown and Ernie Davis.

Personal life
Little lived with his wife DeBorah in Las Vegas. Little finished 40th in his class of 140 at the University of Denver law school, from which he received his masters in legal administration degree in 1975. Little owned automobile dealerships in Denver, the Seattle area and Santa Barbara.
In May 2020, his former Syracuse teammate Pat Killorin announced that Little had been fighting cancer.

Little died on January 1, 2021, at the age of 78.

Career statistics

Legacy 
Floyd Little is portrayed by actor Chadwick Boseman in the 2008 Universal Pictures film The Express: The Ernie Davis Story, a biographical film about Syracuse University Heisman Trophy winner Ernie Davis.

See also
 List of NCAA major college yearly punt and kickoff return leaders
 List of American Football League players

References

Further reading

External links

 
 
 

1942 births
2021 deaths
20th-century African-American sportspeople
21st-century African-American people
African-American players of American football
American Conference Pro Bowl players
American Football League All-Star players
American football running backs
College Football Hall of Fame inductees
Denver Broncos (AFL) players
Denver Broncos players
National Football League announcers
National Football League players with retired numbers
Players of American football from New Haven, Connecticut
Pro Football Hall of Fame inductees
Sportspeople from New Haven, Connecticut
Syracuse Orange football players